Allen's gallinule (Porphyrio alleni), formerly known as the lesser gallinule, is a small waterbird of the family Rallidae. Its former binomial name is Porphyrula alleni. Porphyrio is the Latin for "swamphen", and alleni, like the English name, commemorates British naval officer Rear-Admiral William Allen (1792–1864).

Its breeding habitat is marshes and lakes in Sub-Saharan Africa. They build a floating nest in marshes and swamps, laying 2–5 eggs. This species is partially migratory, undertaking seasonal movements.

Remarkably, this apparently weakly flying bird is not only the only species with a purely sub-Saharan African range to have reached Great Britain, but has done so twice. It has also occurred as a vagrant in several other European countries.

They are similar in size to the only slightly larger water rail. The Allen's gallinule has a short red bill, greenish back and purple upperparts. They have red legs with long toes, and a short tail which is white with a dark central bar underneath. Breeding males have a blue frontal shield, which is green in the female. Immature Allen's gallinules are sandy brown with a buff undertail. The downy chicks are black, as with all rails.

These birds probe with their bill in mud or shallow water, also picking up food by sight. They mainly eat insects and aquatic animals. They nod their heads as they swim.

Allen's gallinules are very secretive in the breeding season, particularly in the dense swamps they favour, and are mostly heard rather than seen. They are then rather noisy birds, with a sharp nasal pruk call. They can be easier to see on migration or when wintering.

References

External links
 (Allen's gallinule = ) lesser gallinule - Species text in The Atlas of Southern African Birds

Allen's gallinule
Birds of the Comoros
Birds of Sub-Saharan Africa
Allen's gallinule